South Branch is a community in Weldford Parish located on the South Branch River on Route 495, 2.55 km E of West Branch

History

South Branch had a Post Office 1873-1960. In 1898 South Branch was a farming and lumbering settlement with 1 post office, 1 sawmill, 1 grist mill, and 1 church. The town had a population of 400. The community was also known as Warrens Mills for Thomas W. Warren (1896–1971) and old photographs at Provincial Archives New Brunswick show photos of this old mill. The Warren Family went on to found Warren's Ready Mix, a company now in Rexton.

Notable people

See also
List of communities in New Brunswick

References
 

Settlements in New Brunswick
Communities in Kings County, New Brunswick